The Liga Nacional de Fútbol is a professional football league in Guatemala  which is the top tier of the Guatemala football league system.

Managers
The list of managers includes everyone who has managed clubs while they were in the Liga Nacional de Fútbol, whether in a permanent or temporary role. Caretaker managers are listed only when they managed the team for at least one match in that period.

  Iván Sopegno - Comunicaciones
  Miguel Ángel Brindisi - Comunicaciones, Municipal
  Horacio Cordero - Comunicaciones, Municipal
  Carmelo Faraone  - Comunicaciones
  Salvador Pericullo  - Comunicaciones
  Raúl Héctor Cocherari  - Comunicaciones 
  Juan Ramón Verón  - Comunicaciones
  Carlos Alberto de Toro  - Comunicaciones
  José Alberto Cevasco - Municipal
  Enzo Trossero - Municipal
  Jorge Habbegger - Municipal
  Jorge José Benítez - Municipal
  Carlos Ruiz - Municipal
  
  Jaime Borja - Municipal
  Fernando Díaz Seguel - Municipal
  Luis Grill Prieto - Municipal
  Rónald González Brenes - Comunicaciones
  Alexandre Guimarães - Comunicaciones
  Marvin Rodríguez - Municipal
  Javier Delgado - Municipal
  Mauricio Wright - Municipal
  Hernán Medford - Municipal
  Jan Poštulka - Municipal
  Federico "Chapuda" Morales - Comunicaciones
  Carlos Enrique "Ronco" Wellman - Comunicaciones
  Jorge "Mono" Lainfiesta  - Comunicaciones
  Victor Hugo Monzon - Municipal
  Carlos Humberto Toledo - Municipal
  Manuel Felipe Carrera - Municipal
 
  
 
  Ramón Maradiaga - Municipal
  Ferenc Meszaros - Municipal
  Alberto Aguilar - Comunicaciones
  Dušan Drašković - Comunicaciones
   Ranulfo Miranda - Comunicaciones
   Ever Hugo Almeida - Municipal
  Walter Ormeño - Comunicaciones, Municipal
  Guilherme Farinha - Municipal
  José Casés Penadés - Comunicaciones
  Rubén Amorín - Comunicaciones, Municipal
  Carlos Miloc - Comunicaciones
  Antonio Alzamendi - Comunicaciones
  Luis Cubilla  - Comunicaciones
  Julio César Cortés  - Comunicaciones
  Gustavo Faral - Municipal
    Manuel Keosseian - Municipal
  Gustavo Machain - Municipal
  Julio González Montemurro  - Comunicaciones
  William Coito Olivera  - Comunicaciones
  Anibal Ruiz  - Municipal
 
Liga Nacional de Fútbol de Guatemala